U-19 Thailand Championship, commonly known as Coke Cup Thailand by title sponsor Coca-Cola, is an annual nationwide youth under-19 association football tournament. It is the largest scale youth amateur sport event in Thailand, even as soccer continues to gain more attention.

The tournament, organized by the Football Association of Thailand and Coca-Cola, First formed in 1979, Before to the match it will be training instructors in the project "Coke go for goal" for the trainer of the schools in Bangkok College of Physical Education and trainers across the country. In later years there has been a nationwide competition for the first time with joined of Thai League 1 club and changed the name of the competition to become more competitive as "Coke Cup Thailand".

Venues

Current venues  
Boonyachinda Stadium

Previous venues 
National Stadium
SCG Stadium
Thephasadin Stadium
Thupatemi Stadium

Champions

Awards

Prize money 
 Champion: 1,000,000 Baht
 Runner-up: 500,000 Baht

References

External links
 Official Football Association of Thailand website 
 Thailand at FIFA site

Football leagues in Thailand